is a Japanese retired football player.

Career
After being a key-player for Kagoshima United FC, Nagahata retired in December 2019.

Club statistics
Updated to 5 April 2020.

References

External links
Profile at Kagoshima United FC

1989 births
Living people
Association football people from Kagoshima Prefecture
Japanese footballers
J1 League players
J2 League players
J3 League players
Japan Football League players
Shimizu S-Pulse players
Giravanz Kitakyushu players
Kagoshima United FC players
Association football midfielders